Wirye New Town is a planned community in Songpa District, Seoul and Gyeonggi Province. It is named after Wiryeseong.

Transportation
 Namwirye station of 
 Geoyeo station of 
 Wirye–Sinsa Line (planned)
 Wirye Line (planned)

References 

New towns in South Korea
New towns started in the 2010s
Songpa District
Seongnam
Hanam